Henry Hargrave (1720–1780) was an English composer, best known for his set of five concertos for bassoon or cello and strings (c. 1765).

Classical-period composers
English classical composers
1720 births
1780 deaths
18th-century classical composers
18th-century British male musicians
English male classical composers